The 2020 Finnish Cup is the 65th season of the Finnish Cup football competition.
 

Until the 2017–2018 season, the tournament was held in the autumn-spring schedule from July to September of the following year. The introduction of this new format of the contest meant that the League Cup was suspended.

The winner of the Finnish Cup qualifies for the 2021–22 UEFA Europa Conference League.

Teams

Group stage
The teams participating in the Group Stage were the teams of Veikkausliiga (12), Ykkönen (12). The group stage was played between January and February 2020 with teams divided into 4 divisional groups, two groups with Veikkausliiga and Ykkönen teams. The four best teams of the Veikkausliiga A and B groups, the first two teams of the Ykkönen A and B teams, and the winners of Kakkonen groups continued in the eighth finals.

Veikkausliiga – Group A

Veikkausliiga – Group B

Ykkönen – Group A

Ykkönen – Group B

Kakkonen – Groups 1–8

1/8 finals

Quarter-finals

Semi-finals

Final

References

External links
Official page 

Finland - List of Cup Finals, RSSSF.com
soccerway.com

Cup 2020-21
Finnish Cup seasons
Finland